Parasyros is a village of the municipality of East Mani. Before the 2011 local government reform it was a part of the municipality of Gytheio. Parasyros is part of the community of Skoutari. Parasyros is located 2 km west of Skoutari, 9 km east of Areopoli and 13 km southwest of Gytheio.

Historical population

History
In 1770 Parasyros sent men to contribute to the Maniot army in the Battle of Vromopigada. The Maniot army assembled in the mountains behind Parasyros called tria kefalia (Three Heads). In the battle that ensued the Maniot army defeated a much superior Ottoman army. It was part of the municipality Karyoupoli between 1845 and 1912, part of the community Skoutari between 1912 and 1997, and part of the municipality Gytheio between 1997 and 2010. Parasyros was occupied by the Nazis in World War II.

See also
List of settlements in Laconia

References

Populated places in Laconia
Populated places in the Mani Peninsula
East Mani